Wayne William Howlett (born 1980) is an Australian Powerlifter who has competed at the World Raw Powerlifting Federation World Championships.

Criminal activity

Until at least 2002, Howlett belonged to a criminal group known as the Glenorchy Mafia, with his brother Shaune Henry Howlett, Benjamin Maxwell Pearce.

In 2002, Howlett was sentenced to 6 months' imprisonment for instigating an aggravated assault on rival gang members Steven Maxwell and Brett Hynes.

Howlett was later involved in an attempt to blow up a forensic laboratory. On 8 March 2000, Howlett, a criminal associate named Joseph Andrew Tonner, went to the Government Analytical & Forensic Laboratory with an explosive device and two tins of petrol. The three climbed onto the roof of the administration building. Howlett prised open a window, and Tonner placed the explosive device on shelving in the building and lit it. The purpose of doing so was said by the prosecution to be to destroy evidence believed to be in the laboratory, that would lead to the conviction of Graeme Hall for trafficking in a substantial quantity of amphetamine. On 22 November 2004, Howlett pleaded guilty to possessing a dangerous object with the intent to commit a crime, and attempting to unlawfully injure property, possessing an explosive device between January 1999 and March 2000, and to igniting petroleum and a bomb in an attempt to damage material inside a forensic laboratory. Howlett received 2 years' imprisonment with 20 months suspended, with Justice Peter Underwood noting, "I have not heard such convincing evidence of self-motivated rehabilitation by a prison inmate".

On 24 March 2010, Howlett pleaded guilty to trafficking in methylamphetamine, after a "sting" operation saw him exchange 27.1 grams of the drug and $4,100 for five pistols. Howlett received 2 years' imprisonment.

On 24 June 2018, Howlett, accompanied by another man, and with his face was smeared with war paint, went to Pablo's Cocktail Bar in central Hobart.  He was armed with a World War Two-era SKS semi-automatic carbine. The gun was loaded, and he carried at least 143 additional 7.62×39mm rounds for it. He fired 25 bullets at the club's steel-clad entrance door, a number of which penetrated it. At his sentencing hearing, Howlett's lawyer said his client had spiralled in to depression and drug use following his 2017 injury and could not remember the incident. The judge did not accept that Howlett had acted on impulse, noting he had a dispute with the club manager, and sentenced Howlett to 5 years' imprisonment, without parole for 3 years.

Powerlifting

While Howlett claims to be a noted Tasmanian powerlifter, he has been banned from organised drug tested sport since testing positive for steroids in competition in 2006. His brother, Shaune Howlett, was suspended at the same time for refusing a drug test and threatening an ASADA official with assault.

Howlett placed 1st in the World Raw Powerlifting Federation (which does not conduct drug testing and allows the use of performance-enhancing drugs) Tasmanian State Titles in 2005, 2012, 2013, 2014, 1st at World Championships in 2012, 2nd at World Raw Powerlifting Federation World Championships in 2013, 2nd at Russian Open Championships in 2015, and 1st in the Down Under Classic in 2017.

Howlett tore a biceps muscle in 2017; despite reconstructive surgery, the injury ended his competitive powerlifting career.

References

1980 births
Living people
Criminals from Tasmania
Australian strength athletes
Australian drug traffickers
Australian people convicted of assault